Nino or Niño may refer to:
Nino (name)
Niño (name)
Antonin Scalia, American Supreme Court justice whose nickname was "Nino"
El Niño, a climate pattern in the tropical Pacific Ocean
NINO, an abbreviation for National Insurance number in the United Kingdom
Niño, the smallest conga drum
"Niño" (Belanova song), 2005
"Niño" (Ed Maverick song), 2021
Nino (novel), a 1938 children's novel by Valenti Angelo
Niño (TV series), a 2014 Philippine TV series
Philips Nino, a PDA-style device
The Netherlands Institute for the Near East

See also
El Niño (disambiguation)
Santo Niño (disambiguation)
Ninos (disambiguation)
Niños (disambiguation)
Cyclonic Niño
Niño Jesús
Cave of Niño